Trinity High School is a private coeducational Roman Catholic  college preparatory High School, located in Garfield Heights, Ohio, United States.  It is located in the Roman Catholic Diocese of Cleveland.  It was started in 1926 by the Sisters of St. Joseph of the Third Order of St. Francis.

Trinity has a  campus that includes the main school building and no athletic fields. The school is accredited by the North Central Association of Colleges and Schools, the Ohio Department of Education, and the Ohio Catholic School Accrediting Association.

History
On August 15, 1926, Archbishop Joseph Schrembs dedicated the new Saint Joseph Academy. It was an all-girls school located in the Marymount Convent in Garfield Heights, and opened with eight students. In 1932 enrollment had increased considerably, and the school was accepted into the North Central Association of Colleges and Schools.

In 1939, the school's name was changed to Marymount High School to avoid confusion with Saint Joseph Academy in Cleveland. In 1954, an increasing enrollment led the need for a new high school building, located just to the east of the convent. On September 5, 1957, 470 girls began classes at the new Marymount High School facility, which today serves as the main building of the Trinity campus. At the same time the Vincentian Sisters of Charity opened Lumen Cordium High School in Bedford, attracting nearby students who might otherwise have enrolled at Marymount. Marymount's enrollment began to decline.

In 1973, the all-girl Marymount High School closed and re-opened as coeducational Trinity High School. The school enrolled 335 girls and 46 boys. Two years later the Byzantine Catholic High School in Parma closed, and a number of students transferred to Trinity.

Academics
The students study a college-prep curriculum including Advanced Placement coursework in subjects such as English, Calculus, History, Spanish, Government and Art. Ninety-five percent of graduating seniors go onto colleges. The school has a Pre-Professional Internship Program helps students to decide on a major. Many of the internships focus on medicine, graphic design, and information technology.

There is an emphasis on educational technology. Students have the opportunity to learn web page design, multimedia, high-end graphic design, and video production as part of the curriculum. Trinity's  campus includes the main school building and several athletic fields.

Athletics
Trinity competes in the Ohio High School Athletic Association.  Trinity has competed in the Chagrin Valley Conference since 2019. Trinity previously was a member of the North Coast League from 1984-2019.

State championships
Ohio High School Athletic Association Championships: 
 Girls basketball – 1990, 1994, 1996
 Football – 1980
 Boys track and field - 2009

OASSA Championship:
 Cheerleading - 2013

Activities
Academic clubs: Environmental Club, National Honor Society, Saint Anthony Society, Spanish Club
Athletic clubs: Danceline/Drill Team, Indoor Track, Wrestling Stats
Athletic teams: Baseball, Basketball, Boys golf, Boys soccer, Cheerleading, Cross country, Football, Girls soccer, Softball, Track, Volleyball, Wrestling
Fine Arts clubs: Art Club, Band, Choir, Drama, Music Ministers, THS News Crew, Yearbook
Leadership clubs: Ambassador Club, Class Officers, Instruments of Peace, SALT

Notable alumni
 Justin Bibb - 58th Mayor of Cleveland
 Semeka Randall - professional basketball player and coach
 Jerry Schuplinski - NFL football coach
 Vonda Ward - professional boxer
 Tom Zakrajsek - professional ice skater

Notes and references

External links
 School website
 Weidenthal, Bud. "Trinity High is Monument to a Nun", Cleveland Press, 1980
 Flanagan, Jack. "Trinity soccer team displays character", Cleveland Plain Dealer, October 2011

High schools in Cuyahoga County, Ohio
Catholic secondary schools in Ohio
Educational institutions established in 1926
1926 establishments in Ohio
Roman Catholic Diocese of Cleveland
Garfield Heights, Ohio